Malamine Koné (December 21, 1971 in Niéna, Mali) is a Malian and French entrepreneur. He is the founder of the sportswear brand Airness. Koné arrived in France at the age of 10 and was raised in the northern Paris suburb of Saint-Denis. Koné became a boxer but his boxing career was cut short after a road accident in 1995. Koné then turned his attention to the fashion business.

External links 
Interview on Afrik.com (2005) 
Interview on Myfreesport.fr (2006) 

1971 births
Living people
French fashion designers
Malian fashion designers
Malian emigrants to France
People from Sikasso Region
People from Saint-Denis, Seine-Saint-Denis